Poręb  is a village in Gmina Żmudź, Chełm County, Lublin Voivodeship, Poland. It is around 15 km south-east of Siedlce and around 100 km east of Warsaw.

References

Villages in Chełm County